Edward Jeroen Sturing (born 13 June 1963) is a Dutch professional football manager and former player. Sturing played as a defender and earned three caps for the Netherlands national team.

Career
Sturing played for De Graafschap and Vitesse, with whom he won the Eerste Divisie championship in 1989. He was also voted best player of the Eredivisie in the 1989–90 season. After his playing career, Sturing worked at Vitesse as assistant coach and manager. From June 2009 until February 2010, he also served as manager of Volendam. He became assistant at Gençlerbirliği and Kayseri Erciyesspor from 2012 to 2014, before returning to Vitesse, where he was once again an assistant manager. Besides that position, Sturing also participates in representative and ceremonial tasks for the club.  

The North Stand at Vitesse's GelreDome was named in his honour in 2016.

Honours

Player
Vitesse
Eerste Divisie: 1988–89
KNVB Cup runner-up: 1989–90

Manager
Vitesse
Eredivisie European competition play-offs: 2017–18

Individual
Golden Boot: 1989–90

External links
Edward Sturing at Wereld van Oranje 
Edward Sturing at Beijen.net 

1963 births
Living people
Dutch footballers
Netherlands international footballers
Dutch football managers
De Graafschap players
SBV Vitesse managers
SBV Vitesse players
FC Volendam managers
Eerste Divisie players
Eredivisie players
Eredivisie managers
Eerste Divisie managers
Sportspeople from Apeldoorn
Association football defenders
SBV Vitesse non-playing staff
Footballers from Gelderland